Risto Božinov (born 10 April 1969) is a Macedonian retired football striker, who last played for FK Vardar.

International career 
He made his senior debut for Macedonia in a September 1998 European Championship qualification match against Malta in which he immediately scored two goals. He has earned a total of 5 caps, scoring 3 goals. His final international was a June 1999 European Championship qualification match against Croatia.

International goals
Scores and results list Macedonia's goal tally first.

References

External links

 German career stats - FuPa

1969 births
Living people
Association football forwards
Macedonian footballers
North Macedonia international footballers
OFI Crete F.C. players
FK Sileks players
FC Gütersloh 2000 players
FK Vardar players
Super League Greece players
Macedonian First Football League players
2. Bundesliga players
Regionalliga players
Macedonian expatriate footballers
Expatriate footballers in Greece
Macedonian expatriate sportspeople in Greece
Expatriate footballers in Germany
Macedonian expatriate sportspeople in Germany